The 2021–22 American Eagles women's basketball team represented the American University Eagles during the 2021–22 NCAA Division I women's basketball season. The Eagles were led by ninth-year head coach Megan Gebbia and played their home games at Bender Arena as members of the Patriot League.

They finished the season 23–9 overall and 13–5 in Patriot League play to finish in second place.  As the second seed in the Patriot League Tournament they earned a bye into the Quarterfinals where they defeated Lafayette, Boston University, and Bucknell to win the title.  They received an automatic bid to the NCAA tournament, where they were the fourteenth seed in the Wichita Region.  They were defeated in the First Round by Michigan to end their season.

Previous season
They finished the previous season 7–4, 6–3 in Patriot League play to finish in first place in the South Division.  They earned a bye in to the Quarterfinals of the Patriot League Tournament where they defeated Army, before losing to Boston University in the Semifinals. They were not invited to the NCAA tournament or the WNIT.

Roster

Schedule
Source:

|-
!colspan=9 style=| Non-conference regular season

|-
!colspan=6 style= | Patriot League regular season

|-
!colspan=6 style=| Patriot League Tournament
|-

|-
!colspan=6 style=| NCAA tournament
|-

Rankings

The Coaches Poll did not release a Week 2 poll and the AP Poll did not release a poll after the NCAA Tournament.

References

American
American Eagles women's basketball seasons
American women's
American women's
American